Sahiwal (Punjabi and ), formerly known as Montgomery, is a city in Punjab, Pakistan. It is the 21st largest city of Pakistan by population and the administrative capital of both Sahiwal District and Sahiwal Division. Sahiwal is approximately 180 km from the major city Lahore and 100 km from Faisalabad and lies between Lahore and Multan. Sahiwal is approximately 152 meters above the sea level. 

The city lies in a densely populated region between the Sutlej and Ravi rivers. The principal crops are wheat, cotton, tobacco, legumes, potato and oil seeds. Cotton goods and lacquered woodwork are manufactured.

History

Following the Ummayad Arab conquest of Punjab cities of Uch and Multan, led by Muhammad bin Qasim. Arabs of Emirate of Multan ruled the region of Sahiwal for few centuries. Then Sahiwal remained part of Multan province of Mamluk dynasty. Sahiwal also remained associated with historic city of Depalpur.

The modern day city of Sahiwal was founded in 1865 when a train station was built at the site of a small village on the Karachi-Lahore railway line. The site was named Montgomery for Sir Robert Montgomery, then lieutenant governor of the Punjab and it replaced Gogera as the capital of the recently created Montgomery district. Two years later in 1867, it was constituted a municipality.

In 1914 construction began of the Lower Bari Doab Canal which now irrigates both the city and wider region.

During the Partition of India in 1947 the city, being part of Montgomery district, was allocated to Pakistan by the Punjab Boundary Commission. This was on the basis of being a Muslim majority area, despite claims from the Indian National Congress and Sikh groups on the basis of greater property ownership and revenues paid to the state.

Climate
The climate of Sahiwal district is extreme, reaching 52 °C in summer, and down to 2 °C in winter. The soil of the district is very fertile. The average rainfall is about 2000 mm.

Education

Notable educational institutes of the city include:

University of Sahiwal
COMSATS University, Sahiwal Campus
Barani Institute of Sciences
Sahiwal Medical College
Quaid-e-Azam College of Engineering and Technology, Sahiwal
Punjab College of Science
The Superior College
Army Public Schools & Colleges System (APSCS)
Beaconhouse School System
Bloomfield Hall School
The City School
Divisional Public School and College
The Educators
Government Postgraduate College Sahiwal
Government College of Technology Sahiwal
Royal Computer Trainning Institute Sahiwal

Twin city
Sahiwal is twinned with the town of Rochdale, in Greater Manchester, North West England. Approximately eight per cent of town's population is of Asian origin, most of whom have links with Pakistan. The twinning arrangement was agreed between Rochdale and Sahiwal in 1998.

Notable people

 Mushtaq Ahmed, former test cricketer
 Majeed Amjad, Urdu poet
 Tariq Aziz, television anchor
 H.K.L Bhagat, Former Union Minister of Parliamentary Affairs of India
 Dildar Pervaiz Bhatti, (TV artist, compere, comedian, anchor)
 Brigadier Kuldip Singh Chandpuri, Indian Army Officer
 Attash Durrani, Urdu writer and Scholar
 Manzoor Elahi, former test cricketer
 Mehdi Hasan, journalist and historian
 Rana Mohammad Hanif Khan, politician and former Finance Minister of Pakistan
 Nazir Naji journalist and Urdu columnist for various media groups.
 Emmanuel Neno, Christian author and translator
 Kunwar Mohinder Singh Bedi Sahar, Urdu Poet
 Nouraiz Shakoor, politician and former Federal minister
 Saieen Zahoor, Sufi musician

See also

Sahiwal killings
 Zafar Ali Stadium
University of Sahiwal

References

External links
 
 NIMLS COLLEGE Sahiwal
 https://archive.org/details/MontgomerytoSahiwal

 
Populated places in Sahiwal District
Sahiwal District
Populated places in Punjab, Pakistan